Insel is the fourth studio album by German band Juli. It was released on 3 October 2014 by Polydor and Island Records.

Track listing

Charts

Release history

References

External links
 Juli.tv – official site

2014 albums
Juli (band) albums
German-language albums